
Gmina Skarbimierz is a rural gmina (administrative district) in Brzeg County, Opole Voivodeship, in south-western Poland.

Villages
Gmina Skarbimierz contains the villages and settlements of Bierzów, Brzezina, Kopanie, Kruszyna, Lipki, Łukowice Brzeskie, Małujowice, Pawłów, Pępice, Prędocin, Skarbimierz, Skarbimierz Osiedle, Zielęcice, Żłobizna and Zwanowice.

Neighbouring gminas
Gmina Skarbimierz is bordered by the town of Brzeg and by the gminas of Lewin Brzeski, Lubsza, Oława, Olszanka, Popielów and Wiązów.

References

Skarbimierz
Brzeg County